Oriole Records was a British record label, founded in 1925 by the London-based Levy Company, which owned a gramophone record subsidiary called Levaphone Records.

History
The Levy family founded a record shop (it also sold bicycles and sewing machines) at 19 High Street, Whitechapel, and later moved to 139 High Street. Oriole recorded popular music in England, and also issued masters from the United States Vocalion Records in May and June 1927. The original label was discontinued in 1935.

Jacques Levy produced records beginning in 1931 at the West End studios at Rosslyn House, 94-98 Regent Street, London, where they stayed until 1937 when they moved to 73 New Bond Street, with chief engineers Ted Sibbick and Bill Johnson, built into what was once an art gallery. In 1949, they segregated the work and the label, with Oriole Records Ltd moving into 104 New Bond Street, London, and with Levy moving out to a factory at Aston Clinton, near Aylesbury with Norman Angier and Leslie Gouldstone from MD-1, later to be joined by others. From 1938 or 1939, David Morris Levy lived nearby at Flat 98, Clarence Gate Gardens, near Baker Street, until his 1971 death, and also maintained a residence in Birchington, Kent.

The owner, David Morris Levy, and his brother Jacques (no relation to his Roulette Records namesake) revived the Oriole label in 1950. For a few years (ending in 1955) it was the exclusive UK licensee for the American Mercury label, with releases by artists such as Frankie Laine, Vic Damone and Patti Page. These releases appeared first on the Oriole label itself, and later on Mercury.

First hits
Oriole achieved a few home-made hits in the late 1950s and early 1960s, including the Chas McDevitt Skiffle Group's version of "Freight Train" (featuring Nancy Whiskey on vocals), "Like I Do" by Maureen Evans (based on the same music as Allan Sherman's "Hello Muddah, Hello Fadduh" – Amilcare Ponchielli's Dance of the Hours – and the label's biggest hit), and Russ Hamilton's "We Will Make Love", which reached number 2 in the UK Singles Chart, and the B-side of which ("Rainbow") reached number 4 in the US Billboard Hot 100 on Kapp Records. Another success for Oriole came from Clinton Ford's 1962 version of the George Formby song, "Fanlight Fanny", which had accompaniment by the 'George Chisholm All Stars'. It also, with permission, had added new words written by Ford. "Fanlight Fanny" was Ford's third UK chart hit and his most successful single, reaching 22 in the UK Singles Chart in March 1962. It spent ten weeks in that chart.

The label also had successes with tracks licensed from European labels, notably Domenico Modugno's original recording of "Volare" and recordings by the Swedish instrumental group the Spotnicks. In the 1960s Oriole licensed several recordings produced by Joe Meek with performances by the Dowlands, Alan Klein and Screaming Lord Sutch. It also distributed several American hits from Columbia Records in the US.

On the long playing LP front, Oriole had a big success in 1954 with the original cast list recording of the hit West End musical, Salad Days, which broke all box office records.

Embassy Records
Oriole also produced cover versions of the hits of the day, which it released on its Embassy label, sold exclusively in Woolworths stores. The repertoire consisted of cut-price cover versions of British pop hits of the day; the first releases were in November 1954. One such release was a version of "Blue Suede Shoes" by Don Arden (father of Sharon Osbourne), who did his best to impersonate Elvis Presley. Embassy later included session cover performances by singer Reg Dwight (later known as Elton John).

Tamla Motown on Oriole American
During the tenure of A&R manager John Schroeder, Oriole was the first UK label (after the odd release on London and Fontana) to license recordings on a regular basis from the US Tamla and Motown catalogues, but none of the releases charted (it was not until a few years later, and on EMI's Stateside label, that the Detroit-based company would begin its run of hits in the UK). Nonetheless, several of the singles have since come to be highly regarded, with recordings including "Do You Love Me" (by the Contours), "You've Really Got a Hold on Me" (the Miracles), and "Fingertips" (Little Stevie Wonder). Oriole released nineteen Motown releases on their black and white Oriole American label, while seven albums appeared on the normal black and yellow Oriole label. The company was known as Tamla Motown outside the US, and these were some of its rarest releases.

Takeover by US Columbia
The Oriole record company had two record pressing factories, one situated in Aston Clinton and the other in Colnbrook. It lasted until 21 September 1964, when it was bought by CBS, parent of the American Columbia Records, which was looking to set up their own manufacturing facility in the UK. The result ended the CBS label's distribution by Philips, and began the phasing out of the Oriole label. The Oriole company was officially renamed CBS Records in 1965. David Morris Levy originally stayed on as managing director, but severed all ties with CBS in 1967.

David Morris Levy's sons, John Jacob, an attorney at Nicholas Morris in London, and Edward Frederick, principal of Chelsea Music Publishing in London, are still active in the music industry.

The Oriole catalogue is now handled by Sony Music, CBS's successor, which was formed after Japanese conglomerate Sony bought CBS Records in 1988 and renamed it Columbia Records in 1991. Reissues from Oriole's releases are distributed by Columbia Records UK.

See also
 List of record labels

References

British record labels
Record labels established in 1927
Record labels disestablished in 1935
Record labels established in 1950
Record labels disestablished in 1965
Re-established companies
F. W. Woolworth Company
Columbia Records
Defunct record labels of the United Kingdom
Jazz record labels